Harlan is a given name and a surname which may refer to:

Surname
Bob Harlan (born 1936 Robert E. Harlan), American football executive
Bruce Harlan (1926–1959), American Olympic diver
Byron B. Harlan (1886–1949), American politician
Byron G. Harlan (1861–1936), American singer
Jack Rodney Harlan (1917–1998), American botanist
James Harlan (Iowa politician), (1820–1899), American politician and lawyer
James Harlan (Kentucky politician) (1800–1863), American politician and lawyer
Jan Harlan (born 1937), German-American film director and producer
John Harlan (announcer) (1925–2017), American television announcer
John Marshall Harlan (1833–1911), United States Union Army officer and Supreme Court Associate Justice
John Marshall Harlan II (1899–1971), former Associate Justice of the United States Supreme Court
Josiah Harlan (1799–1871), American mercenary
Kevin Harlan (born 1960), American sportscaster
Otis Harlan (1865–1940), American actor
Patrick Harlan (born 1970), American-Japanese television presenter
Peter Harlan  (1898–1966), German musical instrument maker and lute player
Richard Harlan (1796–1843), American zoologist
Russell Harlan (1903–1974), American cinematographer
Thomas Harlan (1929–2010), German film director and writer
Veit Harlan (1899–1964), German film director and actor

Given name
Harlan Alaalatoa (born 1988), Australian Rugby League player
Harlan Briggs (1879–1952), American actor, vaudeville performer
Harlan Coben (born 1962), American novelist
Harlan Cohen (born 1934), American volleyball coach 
Harlan Ellison (1934–2018), American writer
Harlan Greene (born 1953), American writer and historian
Harlan Howard (1927–2001), American country music songwriter
Harlan Hubbard (1900–1988), American artist and author
Harlan Huckleby (born 1957), American football running back
Harlan Lane (1936–2019), American psychologist
Harlan Marbley (born 1943), American boxer
Harlan Mills (1919–1996), American professor of computer science
Harlan Fiske Stone (1872–1946), U.S. Supreme Court Justice
Harlan K. Ullman (born 1941), United States military officer and political author
Jessie Harlan Lincoln (1875–1948), granddaughter of United States President Abraham Lincoln

Fictional characters
 Harlan (Stargate), an artificial intelligence in the Stargate SG-1 episode "Tin Man"
 Harlan Rook, in the 1988 film The Dead Pool
 Harlan Jane Eagleton, in Gayl Jones's 1998 novel The Healing
 Harlan Draka, in the Italian comic book series Dampyr
 Harlan Traub, in House of Cards

See also
Christiane Kubrick (née Harlan) (born 1932), German actress, dancer, painter and singer
 Harland (name)